Djibouti competed at the 2019 African Games held from 19 to 31 August 2019 in Rabat, Morocco. In total, athletes representing Djibouti won one silver medal and one bronze medal and the country finished in 33rd place in the medal table.

Medal summary

Medal table 

|  style="text-align:left; width:78%; vertical-align:top;"|

|  style="text-align:left; width:22%; vertical-align:top;"|

Athletics 

Djibouti competed in several events in athletics.

Ayanleh Souleiman won the silver medal in the men's 1500 metres event, the only medal won by an athlete representing Djibouti in athletics.

Youssouf Hiss Bachir also competed in the men's 1500 metres event and he did not finish in the final.

Souhra Ali Med competed in the women's 800 metres event. She qualified to advance to the final where she finished in last place.

Kadra Mohamed Dembil competed in the women's 1500 metres event and she finished in 11th place in the final.

Mohamed Ismail Ibrahim competed in the men's 3000 metres steeplechase event. He finished in 8th place.

Two athletes competed in the men's 5000 metres event: Bouh Ibrahim and Jamal Abdi Direh. They finished in 8th and 14th place respectively.

Mumin Gala competed in the men's half marathon event and did not finish.

Canoeing 

Abdoul-hakim Daoud Abdi competed in the men's K-1 200 metres event. He was also scheduled to compete in the men's K-1 1000 metres event but he did not start.

Chess 

Mohamed Ali Djama, Idriss Elmi Barkhadleh and Hana Abdallah Hassan were scheduled to compete in chess but they did not compete in their events.

Judo 

Four athletes represented Djibouti competed in judo:

 Abdoulgabar Abdourahman Omar (Men's -90 kg)
 Raguib Abdourahman (Women's -52 kg)
 Aden-Alexandre Houssein (Men's -73 kg)
 Moustapha Fouad Hamid (Men's -60 kg)

Aden-Alexandre Houssein won one the bronze medals in the Men's -73 kg event.

Karate 

Kaled Amer Abdoul-Aziz (men's kumite -60kg) competed in karate.

Rowing 

Yahya Djireh Djama competed in the men's lightweight single sculls 500 metres event.

Swimming 

Houssein Gaber Ibrahim competed in the men's 50 metre freestyle and men's 100 metre freestyle events.

Safia Houssein Barkat competed in the women's 50 metre breaststroke and women's 50 metre freestyle events.

Table tennis 

Djibouti competed in table tennis.

Bouhran Abdourazak Abdallah, Djamal Ahmed Mohamed and Mohamed Houmed Saido competed in the men's singles event. They also competed in the men's team event. Mohamed and Saido also competed in the men's doubles event.

Rahma Abdourahman Houssein competed in the women's singles event.

Taekwondo 

Two athletes competed in Taekwondo.

References 

Nations at the 2019 African Games
2019
African Games